Monty Python's The Life of Brian/MONTYPYTHONSCRAPBOOK is a large format book by Monty Python, released in 1979 to tie in with their  film Monty Python's Life of Brian. As the title suggests, it consists of two separate books joined together. The first contains the film's screenplay, illustrated by black and white stills. On the reverse side is the scrapbook, which contains a variety of material such as scenes cut from the film, newly written material plus unrelated items, including the lyrics to Bruces' Philosophers Song. The book was assembled by Eric Idle, with assistance from Michael Palin.

The book is dedicated to Keith Moon, who was to appear in the film but died just before filming began.

Contents of scrapbook
 How It All Began (Three Kings comic strip)
 How It Really All Began
 Heron Bay Diaries with Terry Jones and Michael Palin 
 Monty Python's First Ten Years (A Tribute by The Queen)
 What To Take On filming
 Brian Meets The Psychopath
 Python Cinema Quiz (1)
 Letter to Lorne Michaels
 Python Cinema Quiz (2)
 Brian Feeds the Multitude
 What To Do If You Win...A Granny!
 Research, Costume & Makeup
 Sharing a Caravan With John Cleese
 The Gilliam Collection of Famous Film Titles
 The Healed Loony
 Jerusalem Advocate
 Otto
 Cleese vs. The Evening Standard
 Solidarity
 Python Profiles
 Sermon On The Mount
 The Dead Sea Photos: How They Were Discovered
 Solly and Sarah
 Doc. Chapman's Medical Page
 Monty Python's Flying Circus: An Appreciation by Graham Greene
 The Bruces' Philosophers Song
 A Letter About The Title
 Headmaster
 Martyrdom of St. Brian
 All Things Dull And Ugly

Credits
 Authors - Graham Chapman, John Cleese, Terry Gilliam, Eric Idle, Terry Jones, Michael Palin
 Editor - Eric Idle
 Contributing Editor - Michael Palin
 Designers - Basil Pao, Mike Diehl
 Photography - Drew Mara
 Production Artists - Doug Bevans, Ron & Louise Spencer, Elyse Wyman
 Photography - David Appleby
 Additional Photography - Richard Avedon, Peter Bijou, Larry Dupont, Peter Hall, Gary Heery, Tania Kosevich, Bobby Lavender, Jim McCrary, Eddie Pollock
 Contributing Artists - Terry Gilliam, Neal Adams, Rick Cusick, Ron Kirby

References

Monty Python literature
Methuen Publishing books
1979 books